SKF-89,145 is a drug which acts as a dopamine agonist selective for the D1 subtype. The N-desmethyl derivative SKF-89,626 is also a selective D1 agonist with similar potency and selectivity to SKF 89,145.

References 

D1-receptor agonists
Catechols
Thienopyridines